L'Affaire Lafarge may refer to:

 The 1840 trial and conviction of Marie Lafarge for murdering her husband by arsenic poisoning
 The Lafarge Case, a 1938 French film based on the 1840 case
 Allegations against French cement company Lafarge involving complicity in crimes against humanity